The 1997 Supercopa Sudamericana Finals was the two-legged series of the 1996 Supercopa Libertadores the 10th. (and last) edition of this competition organised by CONMEBOL. It was contested by Brazilian club São Paulo and Argentine club River Plate. 

The first leg, held in Estádio do Morumbi in São Paulo, both teams tied 0–0. In the second leg, held in Estadio Monumental in Buenos Aires, River Plate beat Sao Paulo 2–1 to win their first Supercopa Libertadores title.

Qualified teams

Venues

Match details

First leg

Second leg

References

Supercopa Libertadores Finals
Supercopa Libertadores Finals 1997
Supercopa Libertadores Finals 1997
Football in Buenos Aires
2